Walkaway is an independent romantic comedy film directed and produced by Shailja Gupta released in 2010. Walkaway has a 40% on Rotten Tomatoes based on 5 reviews with an average rating of 3.6 out of 10.

Synopsis
Four intersecting stories, each exploring different aspects of love and companionship, as four friends struggle to find their way through the meanders of Indian matrimony, in a bittersweet attempt to combine their deep-rooted tradition and 'modern' New York life in perfect harmony.

Set in New York, this film mocks the clutches of social obligations on 'modern' professionals from India, and explores subtleties of the Indian mega-institution of marriage, from the now-veiled urban dowry system to the overwhelming compromises demanded of a cross-cultural couple. Darius, Vinay, Shridhar and Soham - single, dating, engaged and married, struggle to maintain some semblance of sanity while questioning themselves, their desires and choices, and the importance of unshakeable traditions. Join them and their loved ones on this journey fraught with ethnic and generational differences, and the pressures of modern relationships and careers. What will they choose to walk away from... family, love, their roots?

Cast
Manu Narayan as Darius, The Charmer
Samrat Chakrabarti as Sridhar, The Village Boy
Manish Dayal as Vinay, The Endearing Spoiled Brat
Saniv Jhaveri as Soham, The Prince Charming
Deepti Gupta as Nidhi, The Nagging Wife
Carrie Anne James as Genevieve, The Dreamer
Pallavi Sharda as Sia, The Practical
Ami Sheth as Anu, The Wild Child

References

External links

Films about Indian Americans